Herman-Joseph (Hajé) Schartman (13 January 1937, in Delden – 7 April 2008, in Nootdorp) was a Dutch politician.

1937 births
2008 deaths
Mayors in South Holland
Members of the House of Representatives (Netherlands)
People from Hof van Twente